Ioannis Giapalakis (4 July 1943 - 30 June 2018) was a Greek sailor. He was born in Kastella, Piraeus. He competed in the Dragon event at the 1972 Summer Olympics. He continued actively sailing until his death at age 74.

References

External links
 

1943 births
2018 deaths
Greek male sailors (sport)
Olympic sailors of Greece
Sailors at the 1972 Summer Olympics – Dragon
Place of birth missing (living people)
Mediterranean Games gold medalists for Greece